I6 or I-6 may refer to:
 , an Imperial Japanese Navy submarine launched in 1935 and sunk in 1944
 Polikarpov I-6, a Soviet fighter prototype of the 1930s
 Straight-six engine, six-cylinder internal combustion engine
 Ravenloft (module), or "I6: Ravenloft," a 1983 adventure module for Dungeons & Dragons

I 6 is a Swedish regimental designation (6th Infantry Regiment) that has been used by the following units:
 Västgöta Regiment (1816–1927)
 North Scanian Infantry Regiment (1928–1963)